Robert Bowes (c. 1553–1600) was an English politician.

He was a Member (MP) of the Parliament of England for Thirsk in 1584 and for Richmond, Yorkshire in 1586.

References

1550s births
1600 deaths
English MPs 1584–1585
English MPs 1586–1587